Willa Sandmeyer is an American television news reporter based in Los Angeles working for the Voice of Prophecy.

Sandmeyer grew up in Washington, D.C. and attended Walla Walla College, graduating with a Bachelor degree of Arts in Journalism.

Joining the CW in 1993, Sandmeyer won an Emmy Award for her coverage of the Malibu fires that year, and helped the station win an Emmy for the live reporting of the 1994 Northridge earthquake. She won another Emmy in 2004 for her contributions to KTLA morning news and won Associated Press Radio-Television awards in 2002 and 2005 as well as a Los Angeles Press Club Award. She left the CW in 2008.

Sandmeyer appears and speaks at community events including events for the Los Angeles Zoo and various police agencies across Southern California in her spare time, as well as hiking, running, and cooking vegetarian Indian dinners for friends.

References

American television news anchors
Year of birth missing (living people)
Living people
Walla Walla University alumni